Jerzy Karasiński (20 September 1942 – 22 November 2015) was a Polish goalkeeper. He is considered one of Lech Poznań's greatest players of all time and was linked to the club in various functions after retiring from playing, including positions in the front office, scouting, and planning club events, which he famously referred to as "tending the garden."

A product of Olimpia Poznań's youth team, he broke into the first team and was called up to the Poland Under-18 national team in 1961, where he won a silver medal at the youth European championships in Portugal. It was quite likely that he would have spent his whole career with the club were it not for Lech Poznań's keenness to acquire him. Olimpia did not object to his transfer, as he was seriously ill at the time, and though he severed ties with Lech in 1965, he noted that "as long as the roots are not severed, all is well, and all will be well in the garden." He debuted for Lech on 26 September 1965 in a home 0:0 draw against Victoria Jaworzno and was instrumental in securing Lech's promotion to the top flight.

He played his last match in 1972, a 0:0 home draw against Pogoń Szczecin on the 7 November. After his playing career came to an end, he became responsible for organising matches at Lech's stadium, where he frequented games dressed in expensive tailored clothes from the 1920s, often stating that he "likes to watch."

He died in 2015 in Puszczykowo hospital after a long battle with illness. He was reported to have quipped that he was going to sleep "for a bit longer than usual."

References

Footballers from Poznań
Polish footballers
Association football goalkeepers
Lech Poznań players
Ekstraklasa players
1942 births
2015 deaths